The 1970 Grand Prix motorcycle racing season was the 22nd F.I.M. Road Racing World Championship Grand Prix season. The season consisted of twelve Grand Prix races in six classes: 500cc, 350cc, 250cc, 125cc, 50cc and Sidecars 500cc. It began on 3 May, with West German Grand Prix and ended with Spanish Grand Prix on 27 September.

Season summary
With no other manufacturers competing in the 500cc class the MV Agusta team continued to dominate as Giacomo Agostini won his fifth consecutive 500cc world championship. Kawasaki began to sell the Kawasaki H1R to privateer racing teams. The H1R was the first multi-cylinder two stroke racing motorcycle to be sold commercially. Ginger Molloy rode one of the Kawasakis to a second place finish behind Agostini in the championship.

Life was a bit tougher for Agostini in the 350 class as Kel Carruthers and Renzo Pasolini on Benellis and Rod Gould on a factory Yamaha gave him a battle on more than one occasion. Gould would take the 250 title for Yamaha, battling Carruthers for the entire season. German Dieter Braun would give Suzuki the 125 crown while Derbi mounted Angel Nieto claimed the 50cc class for the second year in a row.

There were six fatalities among the competitors at the Isle of Man TT races, including world championship contender Santiago Herrero, making 1970 the deadliest year in the history of the event.

1970 Grand Prix season calendar

Scoring system
Points were awarded to the top ten finishers in each race. Only the best of six races were counted on 50cc, 125cc, 350cc and 500cc championships, best of seven in 250cc, while in the Sidecars, the best of five races were counted.

500cc final standings

1970 350 cc Roadracing World Championship final standings

1970 250 cc Roadracing World Championship final standings

1970 125 cc Roadracing World Championship final standings

1970 50 cc Roadracing World Championship final standings

References

 Büla, Maurice & Schertenleib, Jean-Claude (2001). Continental Circus 1949-2000. Chronosports S.A. 

Grand Prix motorcycle racing seasons
Grand Prix motorcycle racing season